The Mandaean Council of Ahvaz (literally the Sabian–Mandaean Association of Ahvaz) is the main organization of the Mandaean religion and the primary authority of the Mandaean ethnic community in Ahvaz, Iran.

History of leadership
The Mandaean Council of Ahvaz was founded in 1349 A.H. (Gregorian year: 1930 or 1931) by Sheikh Salem Sabouri, who was the religious leader of the Mandaeans at that time.

Ganzibra Jabbar Choheili (baptismal name: Mhatam Yuhana br Yahya; or in Arabic: Shaikh Jabar, the son of Ṭawoos) was the head priest or ganzibra of the Mandaean Council of Ahvaz during the 1990s and 2000s.

Ganzibra Jabbar Choheili, chairman of the board of directors of the council, died on the morning of Sunday, December 27, 2014.

Organization
The council has a 13-member board of directors. Mandaeans in Ahvaz and nearby towns nominate and vote for candidates to represent them in the board of directors.

The council's responsibilities include teaching Mandaean language, culture, and religion, as well as resolving internal disputes within the Mandaean community.

Publications

In the late 1990s, the Mandaean Council of Ahvaz, under the leadership of Mhatam Yuhana, commissioned and supervised a new Mandaic transcription of the Ginza Rabba, the primary sacred scripture of Mandaeism. Carlos Gelbert's translation of the Ginza Rabba is primarily based on this version.

The council has also published the  prayerbook, translated by Sheikh Salem Choheili with an introduction by Massoud Forouzandeh.

Gallery

References

Ahvaz
Cultural organisations based in Iran
Religious organisations based in Iran
Religious organizations established in the 1930s
Mandaean organizations